The 1890 Oregon gubernatorial election took place on June 2, 1890 to elect the governor of the U.S. state of Oregon. The election matched Republican businessman and former Portland mayor David P. Thompson against Democratic incumbent Sylvester Pennoyer.

Results

References

Gubernatorial
1890
Oregon
June 1890 events